Hattian may refer to:

 someone or something related to Hattians, an ancient people of Anatolia
 Hattian language, an extinct language, spoken by the Hattians
 someone or something related to the land of Hatti, an ancient region in Anatolia
 Hattian Bala, a town in Azad Kashmir
 Hattian Bala District, a districts in Azad Kashmir
 Hattian Dupatta, a town in Azad Kashmir
 Hattian Graham (b. 1973), a Barbadian cricketer

See also
Hatti (disambiguation)

Language and nationality disambiguation pages